Cinecanal Classics is a Latin American panregional premium movie channel operated by LAPTV, an American company. Its programming is entirely dedicated to classic Hollywood movies.

External links
Cinecanal Classics

Movie channels
Television channels and stations established in 1993